Sumner Z. Kaplan (February 3, 1920 – March 22, 2011) was an American politician who served in the Massachusetts House of Representatives from the 10th Norfolk district from 1955 to 1963.

Early life and education 
Kaplan graduated from University of Massachusetts and Harvard Law School.

Death 
He died of heart failure on March 22, 2011, in Boston, Massachusetts at age 91.

See also
 1955–1956 Massachusetts legislature

References

1920 births
2011 deaths
Democratic Party members of the Massachusetts House of Representatives
University of Massachusetts Amherst alumni
Harvard Law School alumni